2010 Щастя моє / My Joy, directed by Serhiy Loznytsia
 2010 Золотий вересень. Хроніка Галичини 1939-1941 / Golden September. The Halychyna Chronicles 1939-1941, directed by  Taras Khymych (documentary film)
 2011 Гамер / Gámer, directed by Oleh Sentsov
 2011 Вона заплатила життям / She Paid the Ultimate Price, directed by Iryna Korpan (documentary film)
 2011 Той, хто пройшов крізь вогонь / Firecrosser, directed by Mykhailo Illienko
 2011 Легка, як пір'їнка / Feathered Dreams, directed by Andriy Rozhen
 2012 Мамо, я льотчика люблю! / Mom, I Love a Pilot!, directed by Oleksandr Ihnatusha
 2012 Не переймайся / Don't Worry!, directed by Hanka Tretiak
 2012 Гайдамака / Haidamaka, directed by Roman Synchuk (short film)
 2012 Срібна Земля. Хроніка Карпатської України 1919-1939 / Silver Land. The Chronicles of Carpatho-Ukraine 1919-1939, directed by  Taras Khymych (documentary film)
 2012 Хайтарма / Haytarma, directed by Akhtem Seitablaiev
 2012 Звичайна справа / Business as Usual, directed by Valentyn Vasianovych
 2013 Delirium, directed by Ihor Podolchak
 2013 Присмерк / Twilight, directed by Valentyn Vasianovych (documentary film)
 2013 Креденс / Credenza, directed by Valentyn Vasianovych
 2013 Іван Сила / Strong Ivan, directed by Viktor Andiyenko
 2013 Параджанов / Paradjanov, directed by Serge Avedikian and Olena Fetisova
 2013 F 63.9 Хвороба кохання / F 63.9 Love Sickness, directed by Dmytro Tomashpilskyi and Olena Demianenko
 2013 Ломбард / Pawnshop, directed by Liubomyr Levytskyi (Kobylchuk)
 2013 Тіні Незабутих Предків / Unforgotten Shadows , directed by Liubomyr Levytskyi (Kobylchuk)
 2013 Брати. Остання сповідь / Brothers. The final confession, directed by Viktoriya Trofimenko
 2013 Зелена кофта / The Green Jacket, directed by Volodymyr Tykhyi
 2014 Хроніка Української Повстанської Армії 1942-1954 / The Chronicles of Ukrainian Insurgent Army 1942-1954, directed by  Taras Khymych (documentary film)
 2014 Плем'я / The Tribe, directed by Myroslav Slaboshpytskyi
 2014 Поводир / The Guide, directed by Oles Sanin
 2014 Майдан / Maidan, directed by Serhiy Loznytsia (documentary film)
 2015 Легіон. Хроніка Української Галицької Армії 1918—1919 / Legion. The Chronicles of Ukrainian Halychyna Army 1918-1919, directed by  Taras Khymych (documentary film)
 2015 Зима у вогні: Боротьба України за свободу / Winter on Fire: Ukraine's Fight for Freedom, directed by Yevhen Afinieievskyi (documentary film)
 2015 Незламна / Battle for Sevastopol, directed by Serhiy Mokrytskyi
 2015 Загублене місто / Lost City, directed by Vitaliy Potrukh
 2015 Гетьман / Hetman, directed by Valeriy Yamburskyi
 2015 Люби мене / Love Me, directed by Maryna Er Horbach and Mehmed Bahadir Er
 2015 Тепер я буду любити тебе / Now I'm Gonna Love You, directed by Roman Shyrman
 2015 Ukrainian Sheriffs
 2016 The Nest of the Turtledove
 2016 Слуга народа 2 / Servant of the People 2, directed by Aleksey Kiryushchenko
 2017 Інфоголік / Infoholic, directed by Valentyn Shpakov and Vladyslav Klymchuk
 2017 Merry-Go-Round, directed by Ihor Podolchak
 2017 Dustards / Dustards, directed by Stanislav Gurenko
 2017 Black Level, directed by Valentyn Vasyanovych
 2018 Скажене весілля / Crazy Wedding, directed by Vladyslav Klymchuk
 2019 Don't Worry, the Doors Will Open, directed by Oksana Karpovych
 2019 Скажене весілля 2 / Crazy Wedding 2, directed by Vladyslav Klymchuk

2010s
Films
Ukrainian